Rajaputra Rahasyam is 1978 Indian Telugu-language swashbuckler film, produced by Yarlagadda Lakshmaiah Chowdary and C. S. Rao under the Jayalakshmi Movies banner and directed by S. D. Lal. It stars N. T. Rama Rao, Jaya Prada  and music composed by K. V. Mahadevan.

Plot
Once upon a time, there was a King Chandrashekara (M. Balaiah), the king of Alakapuri. In a tour, he enters into the borders of Avanti kingdom where he sees a beautiful girl Parvathi (Pushpalata) and falls in love with her at first sight. He mistakes her as princess of Avanthi and sends a message to the king (Malladi) that he wants to marry her. But actually, she is the slave to the princess of Avanthi, Tripura Sundari Devi (Jamuna), who is dreaming to marry Chandrashekar. During the time of the marriage, Chandrashekara puts the garland on Parvathi's neck, which hurts Tripura Sundari and she decides to take revenge against both of them. After five years, the couple is blessed with a baby boy named as Gajendra. Besides, Tripura Sundari is making a penance in the forest where she comes across a saint, Mantra Siddha (Satyanarayana), she explains her story and he feels happy because his intention is also the same, to take avenge on Chandrashekara. Actually, Mantra Siddha loved and married Chandrashekar's sister for which they are ostracized from the kingdom. Both of them join together and for their revenge, Mantra Siddha uses his five powerful tablets which can transform any creature into another. Tripura Sundari reaches Alakapuri kingdom with a friendly nature and orders her henchman to kidnap and kill the prince in the forest, where he is protected by elephants and taken care. Depressed, Chandrashekar & Parvathi are taken to Mantra Siddha by Tripura Sundari when he transforms Chandrashekara into a Pearl Necklace and Parvathi into an ugly woman. Meanwhile, Mantra Siddha transforms into Chandrashekara, marries Tripura Sundari and creates his daughter as their own. Tripura Sundari hides the 5th tablet for safety.

Years roll by, in the forest, Gajendra (N. T. Rama Rao) grew up as Tarzan. Once the king Chandrashekara goes for hunting along with his daughter Priyadarshini (Jaya Prada) where she was rescued by Gajendra. There onwards, she starts liking him and brings him to the fort and starts teaching him. Gajendra qualifies in all the fields, even starts speaking and both of them fall in love. Knowing this Tripura Sundari wants to eliminate Gajendra because she plans to make Priyadarshini's marriage with her brother Nandi Keshava (Mohan Babu). So, she takes her childhood friend Ratnangi Devi's (Kanchana) help and provokes Gajendra for the competition in which he wins, hence they honors. After that, they put a blame on him that he has molested a girl and in the court, he is insulted that a man without any parental identity nor hierarchy. Priyadarshini also believes it, Gajendra leaves the fort and returns to the forest. After some time, Priyadarshini learns the truth and she too leaves and both of them get married. In the fort, Chandrashekara blames Tripura Sundari for the deed, she could not bear his authority, so, she uses the 5th tablet and again transforms Chandrashekara into Mantra Siddha when he escapes killing Nandi Keshava. Now Gajendra moves in search of parents while a thief has stolen the pearl necklace from Parvathi and sells it to a merchant. Gajendra buys it and accommodates in a hotel where Parvathi tries to take it back, gets hurt and Gajendra serves her. At present, the hotel owner offers a special bed which was used by Vikramarka when he lies on it, Salabangikas on the bed reveals his birth secret and also says how to relieve his parents from this curse. Right now, he has cross 3 phases, so, he starts his journey and reaches the first destination where he removes the curse of a Gandharva (Dhulipala), with his help he lands at second and discharges the curse of two angels (Jayamalini & Halam) by offering Priyadarshini's human form. After that, finds the route to the final where he spots a saint (Mikkilineni) in stone form except the head. The Saint orders Gajendra to achieve the powerful Magical Wand, located at that place. After much struggle, Gajendra acquires it when Mantra Siddha arrives and war erupts. Gajendra stamps him out and makes everyone normal. At last, Priyadarshini also knows the reality of her father, Gajendra hands over the wand to the saint and they all leave to the kingdom when Tripura Sundari commits suicide. Finally, the movie ends with the happy note with a crowning ceremony of Gajendra.

Cast

N. T. Rama Rao as  Gajendra
Jaya Prada as Priyadarshini
Satyanarayana as Sanyasi Mantra Sidda
M. Balaiah as Chandrashekara Maharaju 
Mohan Babu as Nandi Keshava
Allu Ramalingaiah as Sarangudu
Mikkilineni as Rushi
Dhulipala as Kuha Gandharvudu
Rajanala as Chaludu
Malladi as Avanti Maharaju
Chalapathi Rao as Malla
Jagga Rao as Thief 
Jamuna as Tripura Sundari Devi 
Kanchana as Ratnangi Devi 
Pushpalata as Parvathi 
Jayamalini as Apsarasa
Halam as Apsarasa
Padma Khanna as item number

Soundtrack

Music composed by K. V. Mahadevan. Music released by EMI Columbia Audio Company.

References

1970s Telugu-language films
Indian fantasy adventure films
1970s fantasy adventure films
Films based on Indian folklore
Films scored by K. V. Mahadevan
Indian swashbuckler films